The red factor canary is a popular variety of canary. It is named after its colourful plumage, and is a 'color canary', bred for the novelty of its color rather than for its song. It is kept by those who want a pet, as well as those who enjoy showing.

It is an active bird, hardy and very easy to keep; however, it is not easy to breed.

First bred in the 1920s, it is the only colour canary that has an element of red as part of its plumage. It was developed as a cross between another type of finch, the now-endangered Venezuelan red siskin (Spinus cucullatus), and a yellow domestic canary (Serinus canaria forma domestica).

These canaries are bred for showing, so therefore many versions of this canary exist today. They are divided into the Melanin and the Lipochrome classes. These are further divided into frosts (soft feather) or non-frosts (hard feather), which affects how bright their color appears.

Red factor canaries are usually available at most pet stores, and can also be found through bird shows, bird clubs, breeders, and on the Internet.

See also
 Atlantic canary (wild canary)
 Australian plainhead
 Harz Roller

References

Serinus
Bird breeds

External links 
Red factor canary